The 1926–27 Montreal Maroons season was the hockey team's third year of operation. After winning the Stanley Cup in 1925–26, the club was not able to defend the championship, losing in the first round of the playoffs to the Montreal Canadiens.

Offseason

Regular season

Final standings

Record vs. opponents

Game log

Playoffs
The Maroons faced off in a two-game total goals series, a 'Battle of Montreal', against the Montreal Canadiens. The first game finished in a 1–1 tie. The second game went to overtime in a scoreless tie, before the Canadiens scored to win the series, 2–1 on goals.

Player stats

Regular season
Scoring

Goaltending

Playoffs
Scoring

Goaltending

Note: GP = Games played; G = Goals; A = Assists; Pts = Points; +/- = Plus/minus; PIM = Penalty minutes; PPG = Power-play goals; SHG = Short-handed goals; GWG = Game-winning goals
      MIN = Minutes played; W = Wins; L = Losses; T = Ties; GA = Goals against; GAA = Goals against average; SO = Shutouts;

Awards and records

Transactions

See also
1926–27 NHL season

References

External links

Montreal
Montreal
Montreal Maroons seasons